Vadym Gutzeit (also Vadym Guttsayt or Vadym Markovych Huttsayt; born 6 October 1971) is a Ukrainian Olympic champion sabre fencer, and current Ukraine's Youth and Sport Minister, as well as the president of the National Fencing Federation of Ukraine. 

He was world junior sabre champion in 1989 and 1990, fenced in three Olympic Games, was sabre team Olympic champion in 1992, won a bronze medal in the 1991 World Fencing Championships, and was the 2005 Maccabiah Games sabre champion. Since March 2020, Gutzeit has been Ukraine's Youth and Sport Minister. He has been an international referee for the Fédération Internationale d'Escrime (FIE) since 2002. Gutzeit was inducted into the Hall of Fame of the FIE in 2013.

Early life and personal life
Gutzeit was born in Kyiv into a Jewish family. In 1993 he graduated from the Kyiv State Institute of Physical Culture. In 1993-2002 he served as a major in the Armed Forces of Ukraine.

He is married to Ukrainian journalist, and radio and TV presenter, Oksana Gutzeit. They have two children.

Fencing career

Fencer
Gutzeit took up fencing at the age of nine. He won the Ukrainian national sabre championship when he was 15. He fenced for Dynamo (Kiev).

In 1988 he became USSR Junior Sabre Champion. Gutzeit won the gold medal in the Junior Under-20 Sabre World Fencing Championships in 1989 and 1990. In 1991, he won a silver medal in the same event. That year he also won an individual bronze medal, and a Unified Team silver medal, in sabre at the 1991 senior World Fencing Championships. He competed at four Universiade competitions, winning five medals between 1991 and 1999, with gold medals in the individual sabre event in 1997 and 1999.

Olympic champion
Gutzeit is an Olympic champion, and has competed in three Olympics. He competed in the 1992 Summer Olympics in Barcelona for the Unified Team (the former Soviet Union) at the age of 20, and won a gold medal with the sabre team. He also competed in the 1996 Summer Olympics in Atlanta, this time for Ukraine, finishing 6th in the individual sabre event after being defeated 14–15 in the quarter-finals by Russia's Stanislav Pozdnyakov, who eventually won the competition. Gutzeit took part in his third Olympiad at the 2000 Sydney Games, for Ukraine. Seeded No. 13, he lost 10–15 in the table of 16 to 1998 world champion Domonkos Ferjancsik of Hungary. In the sabre team competition, he and Ukraine finished 6th.

Maccabiah Games
Gutzeit, who is Jewish, competed for Ukraine at the 1997 Maccabiah Games in Israel. He competed in the 2001 Maccabiah Games in Israel and won the silver medal in individual sabre. He was defeated in the gold medal final by Sergey Sharikov of Russia. Gutzeit won the gold medal at the 2005 Maccabiah Games, reaping revenge over Sharikov of Russia, as Ukraine also won the team sabre gold medal.

Coach, referee, and official
From 2002 to 2010 Gutzeit was the head coach of Ukraine's fencing team, which won an Olympic gold medal in 2008.

Gutzeit became an international referee in 2002 in all weapons for the International Fencing Federation. He has since officiated in a number of major competitions, including the 2000, 2004, 2012, and 2021 Olympics.

He was vice president of the Ukrainian Fencing Federation from 2000 to 2016, has been President of the Federation since 2017, and has been a member of the executive committee of the National Olympic Committee of Ukraine since 2004. In 2014 he said: "I, an Olympic champion, want to appeal to all the people of Ukraine and Russia! ... I won the Olympic Games in 1992 as part of the CIS combined team .... We respected and loved each other! We were like brothers.... I ask all the politicians of the two countries! We must be friends and respect each other .... And each of us deserves to live happily in our own land."

In 2010-20 Gutzeit was the executive director of the Ukrainian Olympic Training and Sports Center.

Honors

In 1997 Vadym was awarded the Ukrainian Order of Merit III, in 2008 he received the award "For Merit" II, and in 2012 he received the award "For Merit" I. In 2004 he received the honorary title of "Honored Worker of Physical Culture and Sports of Ukraine." In 2016 he received the Insignia of the President of Ukraine. He is also a Ukrainian Honored Master of Sports (1992) and Honored Coach of Ukraine.

Gutzeit was inducted into the Hall of Fame of the Fédération Internationale d'Escrime in 2013.

Political career
On 26 June 2018, Gutzeit was appointed head of the Kyiv City Council's (Kyiv City State Administration) Department of Youth and Sports. He held the position until March 2020.

On 9 June 2019 Gutzeit announced he would take part in the July 2019 Ukrainian parliamentary election with the party Servant of the People. Three days later, however, he withdrew from the election.

Ukrainian Youth and Sports Minister
Since 4 March 2020, Gutzeit has been Ukraine's Youth and Sport Minister. In the Tokyo Olympics held in 2021, Ukraine won 19 medals (up from 11 medals in the prior Olympics), 16th-most among nations (up from 31st), and 4th among nations per capita, while in addition 12 Ukrainians also won medals for other countries. Speaking in 2021 of his Russian former Olympic teammates with whom he represented the USSR, he said: "television really zombies people there." In December 2021, he announced that Ukraine had decided to apply to host the 2028 Winter Youth Olympics, and the 2030 Winter Olympics.

On 28 February 2022, referring to the Russian invasion of Ukraine, he wrote: "No one has the right to threaten our sovereignty and freedom... Sport carries the idea of peace. But if the enemy is on our land – .... We will surely win!"

See also
List of select Jewish fencers

References

External links

 

 Profile at the European Fencing Confederation

1971 births
Living people
Fencers at the 1992 Summer Olympics
Fencers at the 1996 Summer Olympics
Fencers at the 2000 Summer Olympics
Jewish male sabre fencers
Jewish Ukrainian sportspeople
Maccabiah Games medalists in fencing
Maccabiah Games gold medalists for Ukraine
Maccabiah Games silver medalists for Ukraine
Competitors at the 2001 Maccabiah Games
Competitors at the 2005 Maccabiah Games
Merited Coaches of Ukraine
Military personnel from Kyiv
Olympic fencers of the Unified Team
Olympic fencers of Ukraine
Olympic gold medalists for the Unified Team
Olympic medalists in fencing
Medalists at the 1992 Summer Olympics
Soviet male sabre fencers
Universiade medalists in fencing
Universiade gold medalists for Ukraine
Universiade silver medalists for Ukraine
Recipients of the Order of Merit (Ukraine), 1st class
Recipients of the Order of Merit (Ukraine), 2nd class
Servant of the People (political party) politicians
Sportspeople from Kyiv
Ukrainian male sabre fencers
Ukrainian sportsperson-politicians
Youth and sport ministers of Ukraine
Medalists at the 1995 Summer Universiade
Medalists at the 1997 Summer Universiade
Medalists at the 1999 Summer Universiade